César Dario Pérez Hernández (born September 28, 1966) is a former Major League Baseball outfielder who played 61 games for the Cincinnati Reds in  and , mostly in left field.

Career
He was drafted by the Montreal Expos in the 1st round of the  amateur draft (Dominican Draft) and in  the Reds selected him off the waiver wire. 

He made his major league debut on July 19, 1992 as a pinch hitter for Chris Hammond against the St. Louis Cardinals. His final game came on May 17, 1993 as a defensive replacement in left field against the Los Angeles Dodgers. After his major league career, Hernández went on to play with the Pittsburgh Pirates minor league system, Leones de Yucatán and Piratas de Campeche of the Mexican League, and the Uni-President Lions of the Chinese Professional Baseball League.

External links

1966 births
Chattanooga Lookouts players
Cincinnati Reds players
Buffalo Bisons (minor league) players
Burlington Expos players
Dominican Republic expatriate baseball players in the United States
Harrisburg Senators players
Indianapolis Indians players
Jacksonville Expos players

Living people
Major League Baseball outfielders
Major League Baseball players from the Dominican Republic
Nashville Sounds players
Rockford Expos players
West Palm Beach Expos players
Uni-President Lions players
Dominican Republic expatriate baseball players in Taiwan